The Columbus Quest was a professional women's basketball franchise located in Columbus, Ohio in the now-defunct American Basketball League (ABL).  They were one of the league's original eight teams that started play in 1996.  In the league's brief history, the Quest was its most successful franchise, winning both championships the league awarded.

The Quest's head coach was Brian Agler, who finished with a record of 82–22 during the team's two-plus seasons of existence. After Agler left the Quest midseason to become the head coach of the WNBA's Minnesota Lynx, the team was coached by player-coach Tonya Edwards
.  Many of the Quest's players later played for the Lynx, including Edwards, Katie Smith, Andrea Lloyd-Curry, Angie Potthoff and Shanele Stires.

The Quest played their home games at the Greater Columbus Convention Center in Battelle Hall. Despite being the league's most successful team, they had the league's lowest average attendance for all three years of the ABL's existence.

Season-By-Season

1996–97
Finished 31–9, won Eastern Conference by 10 games
Defeated San Jose Lasers in Semifinals 2–0 (best of 3)
Game 1 at San Jose: Columbus 94, San Jose 69
Game 2 at Columbus: Columbus 81, San Jose 69
Defeated Richmond Rage in Championship 3–2 (best of 5)
Game 1 at Columbus: Columbus 90, Richmond 89
Game 2 at Columbus: Richmond 75, Columbus 62
Game 3 at Richmond: Richmond 72, Columbus 67
Game 4 at Richmond: Columbus 95, Richmond 84
Game 5 at Columbus: Columbus 77, Richmond 64
Nikki McCray named Most Valuable Player
Brian Agler named Coach of the Year
Valerie Still named Playoffs Most Valuable Player

1997–98
Finished 36–8, won Eastern Conference by 12 games
Defeated San Jose Lasers in Semifinals 2–0 (best of 3)
Game 1 at Columbus: Columbus 94, San Jose 88
Game 2 at San Jose: Columbus 74, San Jose 62
Defeated Long Beach Stingrays in Championship 3–2 (best of 5)
Game 1 at Long Beach: Long Beach 65, Columbus 62
Game 2 at Long Beach: Long Beach 71, Columbus 61
Game 3 at Columbus: Columbus 70, Long Beach 61
Game 4 at Columbus: Columbus 68, Long Beach 53
Game 5 at Columbus: Columbus 86, Long Beach 81
Valerie Still named Playoffs Most Valuable Player

1998–99
Finished 11–3, leading Eastern Conference by 2 games

References

American Basketball League (1996–1998) teams
Defunct basketball teams in the United States
Basketball teams established in 1996
Basketball teams in Ohio
Sports clubs disestablished in 1998
Sports teams in Columbus, Ohio
Women's sports in Ohio
Basketball in Columbus, Ohio

ca:American Basketball League III